Miles Community College is a public community college in Miles City, Montana.

History 

The college was founded in 1939. For almost 20 years it operated out of a few rooms in the local public high school. In 1957, MCC moved into the former Milwaukee Railroad Depot building.

In June 1967, the college moved into a new building that was constructed after passage of a bond issued by county voters. On April 4, 1970, voters of the district elected the first independent board of trustees for the college. In December 1971, Miles Community College was granted accreditation by the Northwest Commission on Colleges and Universities.

During academic year 1971-72, a new student center was constructed. A grant of $1.5 million from the Montana Coal Board in 1977 enabled the college to construct a new vocational building and a library learning resource center classroom addition. Construction of a physical education complex was completed in November 1980. In August 1997, four new dormitory buildings were added to the student housing complex. Six years later, in October 2003, the college completed a new $2.3 million dormitory.

Athletics 
MCC currently has 5 varsity sports; Men's and Women's Basketball, Baseball, Golf and Rodeo. The Baseball program has won 13 straight conference titles under former Head Coach Rob Bishop and current Head Coach Jeff Brabant, dating back to the re-introduction of the sport to the school in the 2001 season.

On May 4, 2009, the board of trustees voted 6-0 in favor of discontinuing the volleyball program after a search for a head coach turned up no qualified candidates.

References 

Universities and colleges accredited by the Northwest Commission on Colleges and Universities
Education in Custer County, Montana
Buildings and structures in Miles City, Montana
1939 establishments in Montana
Community colleges in Montana
NJCAA athletics
Educational institutions established in 1939
Miles City, Montana